The Solo routine competition of the synchronised swimming at the 2012 European Aquatics Championships was held on May 23 with the technical and May 24 with the free routine preliminaries. The final was held on May 26.

Medalists

Results
The preliminary rounds were held at 12:00 local time on May 23–24. The final was held at 12:00 on May 26.

Green denotes finalists

References 

2012 European Aquatics Championships